Executive Order 14006, officially titled Reforming Our Incarceration System to Eliminate the Use of Privately Operated Criminal Detention Facilities, is an executive order signed by U.S. President Joe Biden on January 26, 2021. The Department of Justice will not renew any existing contracts with privately operated prisons.

Effects 
It will gradually abolish the US government's reliance on privately operated detention facilities as they tend to not have the same level of safety as state-owned ones.

See also 
 Incarceration in the United States#Privatization
 List of executive actions by Joe Biden
 Prison–industrial complex

References 

2021 in American law
Executive orders of Joe Biden
January 2021 events in the United States
Private prisons in the United States